"Til I'm Holding You Again" is a song recorded by American country music group Pirates of the Mississippi.  It was released in February 1992 as the second single from the album Walk the Plank.  The song reached #22 on the Billboard Hot Country Singles & Tracks chart.  The song was written by band members Bill McCorvey and Rich Alves, along with Larry Gottlieb.

Chart performance

References

1992 singles
1991 songs
Pirates of the Mississippi songs
Songs written by Larry Gottlieb
Song recordings produced by Jimmy Bowen
Capitol Records Nashville singles
Songs written by Rich Alves